Scary Kids Scaring Kids (abbreviated SKSK) is an American post-hardcore band formed in Gilbert, Arizona, United States, in 2002.

The band's name was taken from the Cap'n Jazz song of the same name.  They released two studio albums The City Sleeps in Flames (2005) and the self-titled Scary Kids Scaring Kids (2007) with the late member and lead vocalist Tyson Stevens. The band disbanded following a farewell tour in 2010. In 2019, the group reunited for a 15-year anniversary reunion tour in January 2020 and have continued to tour and announced a new album for release in May 2022.

History

2002–2005: Early years, After Dark and The City Sleeps In Flames
The band – which originally was composed of Tyson Stevens on bass guitar and lead vocals (later to be strictly the vocalist/songwriter), guitarists Chad Crawford, DJ Wilson (later to switch to bass) and Steve Kirby, Pouyan Afkary on keyboards, and drummer Peter Costa – recorded their self-financed debut EP, After Dark, while they were still in Highland High School. The band graduated from Highland in 2003. After Dark was eventually re-released by Immortal Records in 2005. After nearly disbanding, they decided to pursue the band full-time, hosting nude carwashes and taking out loans to finance their tours.

The band was then signed to Immortal Records, where they released their first album: The City Sleeps in Flames. The album was recorded during February and March 2005 with producer Brian McTernan, and released on June 28, 2005.

2006–2007: Self titled album
Scary Kids Scaring Kids, released on August 28, 2007, and produced by Don Gilmore (who previously worked on Dashboard Confessional, Good Charlotte, Linkin Park, and Trust Company records) in North Hollywood, California, was the result of much consideration and effort by the band, even though they had spent most of the year living on the road. The band specifically wanted the record to be a composed album, rather than a collection of songs thrown together. This is evidenced by transitions between songs, a prelude and an interlude, as well as references throughout the album to previous tracks on the record.

In 2007, Scary Kids Scaring Kids was awarded Best Noise/Screamo Band at the 2007 Arizona Ska Punk Awards Ceremony in Phoenix, Arizona.  They took home the Best Noise/Screamo Band Award again in 2010, and won the Best Independent Band Award in 2009.

In January 2008, the band was awarded a Libby Award by PETA for Best Newcomers. Scary Kids Scaring Kids received the award for their work in speaking up against Chicken Express for the PETA's 'I Am Not A Nugget' campaign.

2008–2010: Label change, follow-up album and break-up
The band left Immortal Records and signed their major label deal with RCA Records. During their fall tour with Anberlin, Straylight Run, and There for Tomorrow, the band announced they would be working on their third studio album at the end of the tour, but decided to part ways before tracking new material.

Lead singer Tyson took some personal time off in the last four days of the 2009 Warped Tour and the band had tour members Craig Mabbitt of Escape the Fate, Brandon Bolmer formerly of Chiodos, Vic Fuentes of Pierce the Veil and Cove Reber, formerly of Saosin, filling in on vocals for the rest of the tour.

On November 30, 2009, Pouyan posted an official statement declaring that by mutual agreement the group had disbanded.

Derek Smith served as the band's drummer for their 2010 tour and opened shows with his new hip hop act, Mod Sun. The album that the band was recording in 2009 was never finished (as the band did not record vocals for it) or released.

2014–2019: Tyson Stevens death and "Loved Forever" single
Vocalist Tyson Stevens was found dead from a suspected heroin overdose on the morning of October 20, 2014 at the age of 29. On September 29, 2019, Scary Kids Scaring Kids released a song titled "Loved Forever" to honour what would have been a wish of Stevens's 34th birthday. The song was written by rhythm guitarist Chad Crawford and produced by Hiram Hernandez. On November 18, 2019, members Crawford,  Afkary and Costa announced that Scary Kids Scaring Kids would be reuniting for one more time for the 15 year anniversary tour of The City Sleeps in Flames release alongside touring members featuring  ex-Saosin and Dead American frontman Cove Reber on vocals, Don Vedda on lead guitar and
Jordan Flower on bass.

2020–present: The City Sleeps in Flames 15 year anniversary tour and Out of Light
The group toured The City Sleeps in Flames 15 year anniversary tour from January 13, to 24, 2020, in partnership with To Write Love On Her Arms.

Additional East Coast dates were announced to take place between June 27, and July 12, with support from The Classic Crime, Picturesque, and Eidola, but later all the dates were postponed indefinitely due to COVID-19 pandemic.

On February 4, 2021, Scary Kids Scaring Kids announced signing to Velocity Records and teased recording some new material in studio via Instagram.

The rescheduled East Coast dates were played from September 17 to October 1, 2021, with Eidola being switched out with The Villa. During this tour Scary Kids Scaring Kids occasionally performed a new song titled "Knock It All Down" live.

On October 5, 2021, the band announced they would be releasing "The Lost Album Demos" (2010) composed of scratch tracks, demos and raw ideas that were intended to develop into their 4th studio release back in 2010, via their Discord channel.

On December 18, 2021, Velocity Records Tour 2022 consisting of SKSK, D.R.U.G.S., Dead American and Secrets was announced to take place from February 16 to March 20, 2022. This tour was eventually played with Kurt Travis (Royal Coda, ex-Dance Gavin Dance) filling in on lead vocals.

On December 19 and December 23, 2021, the band played two shows with Donovan Melero (of Hail the Sun and Sianvar) on lead vocals.

On February 22, 2022, the band released "Knock It All Down (feat. Lil Lotus)", the first single off the third album titled "Out of Light". A second single titled "Nightmare" was released with Spencer Charnas from Ice Nine Kills a month later.

Out of Light was released on May 27, 2022. Each track on the album features a different guest vocalist.

In January 2023, the band played a mini-tour (including performance at Kill Iconic Records 23) with Craig Mabbitt on vocals.

Band members

Current members
 Chad Crawford – rhythm guitar, backing vocals (2002–2010; 2019–present)
 Pouyan Afkary – keyboards, synthesizers, programming, piano, backing vocals (2002–2010; 2019–present)
 Jordan Flower – bass, backing vocals (2019–present)
 Jared "Vaines" Gaines – lead guitar, backing vocals (2021–present)

Former members
 Tyson Stevens – lead vocals, additional guitar, programming (2002–2010); bass (2002–2004; died 2014)
 DJ Wilson – bass, backing vocals (2004–2010); lead guitar (2002–2004)
 Peter Costa – drums, percussion (2002–2005; 2019–2020)
 Steve Kirby – lead guitar, backing vocals (2004–2010)
 Justin Salter – drums, percussion (2005–2007)
 James Ethridge – drums, percussion (2007–2009)
 Tanner Wayne – drums, percussion (2009)
 Derek Smith – drums, percussion (2009–2010)

Former touring members
 Brandon Bolmer – vocals (2009)
 Vic Fuentes – vocals (2009)
 Craig Mabbitt – vocals (2009, 2022-2023)
 Cove Reber – lead vocals (2009, 2019–2021, 2022)
 Don Vedda – guitars, backing vocals (2019–2020)
 Lil Lotus – lead vocals (2021–present; featured live on "Knock It All Down" only)
 Donovan Melero – lead vocals (2021; 2022 occasionally featured live on "Black Hole" only)
 Cody Ash – drums (2022)
 Kurt Travis – vocals (2022, 2023)

Discography
Studio albums
The City Sleeps in Flames (2005)
Scary Kids Scaring Kids (2007)
 Out of Light (2022)
EPs
After Dark (2003) (reissued 2017)

Singles
 "Snake Devil" (2007)
 "Loved Forever" (2019) 
 "Knock It All Down" (2022)
 "Nightmare" (2022)
 "Escape from My Reality" (2022)

Other appearances
Punk Goes 90s (2006)
A Santa Cause: It's a Punk Rock Christmas Vol. 2 (2006)
Punk Goes Crunk (2008)

References

External links
 
 Interview with Pouyan
 Scary Kids Scaring Kids Interview February 7, 2007 on DrivenFarOff.com

Rock music groups from Arizona
American emo musical groups
People from Gilbert, Arizona
American post-hardcore musical groups
Musical groups established in 2002
Musical groups disestablished in 2010
Musical groups reestablished in 2019
2002 establishments in Arizona
RCA Records artists
Equal Vision Records artists